Jaime de la Té y Sagau (1684 in Barcelona – 1736 in Lisbon) was a Spanish composer active at the court of King João V in Lisbon.

Works, editions and recordings
 Cantata "Tiorba Cristalina"
 Cantata a Santa Maria

References

1684 births
1736 deaths